Pacte per Eivissa (PxE) was a political platform formed in Ibiza in 2011. It contested the 2011 Balearic election in coalition with the Socialist Party of the Balearic Islands (PSIB) as an electoral alliance formed by Republican Left of Catalonia (ERC) and People for Ibiza (GxE). GxE obtained one representative for the constituency of Ibiza.

Electoral performance

Parliament of the Balearic Islands

 * In coalition with the Socialist Party of the Balearic Islands.

Member parties
Republican Left of Catalonia (ERC)
People for Ibiza (GxE)

References

Political parties in the Balearic Islands
Defunct political party alliances in Spain
Political parties established in 2011